Airwaves Airlink was an airline based in Zambia. The airline was merged into Zambian Airways.

Services 

Airwaves Airlink operated a Lusaka to Ndola service (at March 2005).

Fleet 

The Airwaves Airlink fleet consisted of one Beechcraft 1900C-1 aircraft.

References

Defunct airlines of Zambia
Airlines established in 2004
Airlines disestablished in 2006
2004 establishments in Zambia
2000s disestablishments in Zambia